Simbalbara National Park is a national park in India, located in the Paonta Valley of Sirmour District, Himachal Pradesh, along its border with Haryana. It is also known as Col. Sher Jung National Park. The vegetation consists of dense Sal forests with grassy glades. The protected area was created in 1958 as the Simbalbara Wildlife Sanctuary with 19.03 km². There is a perennial stream in the valley. The Travel and Tourism department of Himachal Pradesh has preserved the park in its natural form.

Simbalbara Forest Rest House is connected from Puruwala and provides views of the valley. Tiger  Goral, Sambhar and Chittal are the common animals found here.  There are walking trails also in the adjoining forests. October and November are the best times to visit the park.

Access
Nearest airport: Chandigarh (87-km from Nahan)
Railway: The nearest railhead is at Ambala cantt. (63-km from Nahan)
By road: Nahan is accessible connected by road, linked to many cities and tourist spots.
Nearest village: Palhori opposite Simbalbara

See also
Kalesar National Park, Haryana
Rajaji National Park, Uttarakhand

Notes and references

External links
himachaltourism.nic.in
hptdc.gov.in

1958 establishments in Himachal Pradesh
2010 establishments in Himachal Pradesh
Protected areas established in 2010
Protected areas established in 1958
Protected areas of Himachal Pradesh
National parks in Himachal Pradesh
Sirmaur district
Geography of Sirmaur district